Pétfürdő is a village in Veszprém county, Hungary. During the Oil Campaign of World War II, the Pétfürdő oil refinery and the nitrogen fertilizer plant were bombed by the United States Army Air Forces.

External links 
 Street map (Hungarian)

Populated places in Veszprém County